Lentilactobacillus is a genus of lactic acid bacteria.

Species
The genus Lentilactobacillus comprises the following species:
 Lentilactobacillus buchneri (Henneberg 1903) Zheng et al. 2020
 Lentilactobacillus curieae (Lei et al. 2013) Zheng et al. 2020
 Lentilactobacillus diolivorans (Krooneman et al. 2002) Zheng et al. 2020
 Lentilactobacillus farraginis (Endo and Okada 2007) Zheng et al. 2020
 Lentilactobacillus hilgardii (Douglas and Cruess 1936) Zheng et al. 2020
 Lentilactobacillus kefiri (Kandler and Kunath 1983) Zheng et al. 2020
 Lentilactobacillus kisonensis (Watanabe et al. 2009) Zheng et al. 2020
 Lentilactobacillus kribbianus Bai et al. 2020
 Lentilactobacillus otakiensis (Watanabe et al. 2009) Zheng et al. 2020
 Lentilactobacillus parabuchneri (Farrow et al. 1989) Zheng et al. 2020
 Lentilactobacillus parafarraginis (Endo and Okada 2007) Zheng et al. 2020
 Lentilactobacillus parakefiri (Takizawa et al. 1994) Zheng et al. 2020
 Lentilactobacillus raoultii Zheng et al. 2020
 Lentilactobacillus rapi (Watanabe et al. 2009) Zheng et al. 2020
 Lentilactobacillus senioris (Oki et al. 2012) Zheng et al. 2020
 Lentilactobacillus sunkii (Watanabe et al. 2009) Zheng et al. 2020

Phylogeny
The currently accepted taxonomy is based on the List of Prokaryotic names with Standing in Nomenclature and the phylogeny is based on whole-genome sequences.

References

Lactobacillaceae
Bacteria genera